The Men's aerials competition at the FIS Freestyle Ski and Snowboarding World Championships 2019 was held on February 5 and 6, 2019.

Qualification
The qualification was started on February 5, at 15:35. The 12 best skiers qualified for the final.

Final
The final was started on February 6, at 19:20.

References

Men's aerials